Okpamheri (Opameri) is an Edoid language of Nigeria. The number of speakers is not known; there were 30,000 in 1973.

References

Edoid languages